Georg Eliassen (1 July 1880 – 24 December 1964) was a Norwegian architect.

Personal life
Eliassen was born in Kristiania to Anton G. Eliassen and Ragna Gundersen. In 1907 he married Helfrid Beda Andrea Strömberg. They were parents of Trond Eliassen and Arnt Eliassen. Their daughter  married educator and politician Torolv Solheim.

Career
Eliassen was educated from the Kristiania tekniske skole and the KTH Royal Institute of Technology in Stockholm. He was decorated Knight, First Class of the Order of St. Olav in 1951. He died in Oslo in 1964.

References

1880 births
1964 deaths
Architects from Oslo